Dobo Forest Park is a forest park in the Gambia. Established on January 1, 1954, it covers 732 hectares.

It is located at an estimated height of 9 meters above sea level.

References
  
 

Protected areas established in 1954
Forest parks of the Gambia